Lankford may refer to:

Lankford (surname)
Lankford coefficient
Lankford Highway, United States
Lankford House, Maryland, United States
Lankford Smith (1914–1978), New Zealand footballer

See also
Langford (disambiguation)